Östersund 2002 was an unsuccessful bid by Östersund, Sweden, and the Swedish Olympic Committee to host the 2002 Winter Olympics. The city bid for the third consecutive time, and it was sixth time that Sweden had submitted a bid.

Venues

The proposed venues concept comprised two main areas:

Östersund
 ceremonies
 biathlon (Remonthagen),
 ski jumping, Nordic combined, sliding sports (Östberget)
 cross-country skiing
 men's ice hockey, figure skating, short-track speed skating (Sportfältet)
 speed skating (Lövsta)

Åre
 alpine skiing (Åre Ski Area)
 freestyle skiing
 snowboard
 curling, women's ice hockey (Åre Hallen)

Bid's evaluation
The IOC evaluation report praised the support by both Swedish government and the Östersund residents (the poll showed 70% support). The overall games and transport concept were considered excellent, as many venues were already homologated by the FIS, and the competitions would have been staged in two main zones one an hour by road from the other, or just 40 minutes by train. The airport is located just 15 minutes away. Other issues rated favorably were: a single Olympic Village which would form part of an urban development project on the lakeside, excellent facilities planned for the media, and US$780 million budget guaranteed by the Swedish government.

However, the evaluation report listed some problems that might have occurred. The ski jumps were planned to be constructed, but the amount of space reserved for seating would have to be reviewed, as the commission deemed it inadequate to cope with 40,000 spectators. Environmental impact assessment had not been carried out for several sport venues and the site chosen for bob and luge track was in a residential area, which might have caused problems with access and spectator capacity.

Aftermath
During the 104th IOC meeting held in Budapest the bid got 14 votes and lost in the first round to Salt Lake City.

References

External links

 Östersund 2002 Volume 1
 Östersund 2002 Volume 2
 Östersund 2002 Volume 3

2002 Winter Olympics bids
2002 in Swedish sport

Sport in Östersund